Michał Tober (born 10 April 1975 in Warsaw) is a Polish politician. He was elected to Sejm on 25 September 2005, getting 8945 votes in 20 Warsaw district as a candidate from Democratic Left Alliance list.

He was also a member of Sejm 2001-2005.
He used to serve as a spokesman of Leszek Miller - Polish Prime Minister until 2004. Once Miller has resigned, and the MP post was taken by Marek Belka, Mr Tober was excluded from the MP office members.

During his appointment as a spokesman of the MP Mr Tober was involved in creation of media legislation bill. His work was not appreciated by media experts, as his experience as a lawyer and media expert was that times minor.

See also
Members of Polish Sejm 2005-2007

External links
Michał Tober - parliamentary page - includes declarations of interest, voting record, and transcripts of speeches.

1975 births
Living people
Politicians from Warsaw
Democratic Left Alliance politicians
Members of the Polish Sejm 2001–2005
Members of the Polish Sejm 2005–2007